Petrosedum ochroleucum, the European stonecrop, is a species of plant in the family Crassulaceae native to Europe and Turkey.

References

Petrosedum ochroleucum